Lenggeng is a mukim in Seremban District, Negeri Sembilan, Malaysia.

APIIT/UCTI's Student Activity and Recreation Council held the 2009 Leadership camp in a place called Excel Training Resort in Lenggeng.

References

Mukims of Negeri Sembilan